The Bahamian slender blind snake (Cubatyphlops biminiensis) is a species of snake in the family Typhlopidae.

Geographic range
C. biminiensis is endemic to the Bahamas.

Description
C. biminiensis has a long and slender body. The dorsal scales in the vertebral row number 465-500 from the rostral to the tail-tip spine, and the scales around the body number 22–24. The snout is broad and rounded. The rostral scale is wide, half as wide as the head. The preocular is in contact with the second and third upper labials.

Reproduction
C. biminiensis is oviparous.

References

Further reading
Hedges, S. Blair, Angela B. Marion, Kelly M. Lipp, Julie Marin, and Nicolas Vidal (2014). "A taxonomic framework for typhlopid snakes from the Caribbean and other regions (Reptilia, Squamata)". Caribbean Herpetology 49: 1-61. (Cubatyphlops biminiensis, new combination, p. 8).
Richmond, Neil D. (1955). "The Blind Snakes (Typhlops) of Bimini, Bahama Islands, British West Indies, with Description of a New Species". American Museum Novitates (1734): 1–7. (Typhlops biminiensis, new species).
Schwartz, Albert, and Richard Thomas (1975). A Check-list of West Indian Amphibians and Reptiles. Carnegie Museum of Natural History Special Publication No. 1. Pittsburgh, Pennsylvania: Carnegie Museum of Natural History. 216 pp. (Typhlops biminiensis, p. 196).

Cubatyphlops
Reptiles described in 1955